Fieldtrip is the third album by Canadian rock group GrimSkunk released in 1998. It is the last album to feature Marc "Boris" St-Maurice on bass. Shantal Arroyo appears on "¡Ya Basta!" and "La pistolera". Uncle Costa appears on "Ska-se (Shut The Fuck Up)". I Ronee from Race appears on "Looking For Gabbio". Videos were made for the songs "Looking For Gabbio" and "Gros tas d'marde".

Track listing 
"Mahmoud's Dream"
"Gotta Find A Way"
"Live For Today"
"Looking For Gabbio"
"Gros tas d'marde"
"Meltdown"
"¡Ya Basta!"
"Fox Hunt"
"La pistolera"
"Dimming The Light"
"Lâchez vos drapeaux"
"Oh My God"
"Ska-Se (Shut The Fuck Up)"

References 
Bande à part profile

Music videos:

 "Looking For Gabbio"

  "Gros tas d'marde"

GrimSkunk albums
1998 albums
Indica Records albums